San Cristóbal is the capital city of the Venezuelan state of Táchira. It is located in a mountainous region of Western Venezuela. San Cristóbal was founded on March 31, 1561, by Juan de Maldonado. From its inception, the city evolved rapidly as one of the most progressive and important centers of commerce in the country, due primarily to its rich soil and its proximity to the border with Colombia. 

The city was severely damaged by the Earthquake of Cúcuta (also known as Earthquake of the Andes) in 1875. The city is located on the Pan-American Highway.

Education
San Cristobal has a large student population. There are many post-secondary schools, both public and private, in San Cristobal.
The main higher education facilities are:
 Universidad Nacional Experimental del Táchira (UNET)
 Universidad de los Andes (ULA)
Universidad Católica del Táchira (UCAT)
 Universidad Nacional Experimental de las Fuerzas Amadas (UNEFA)
 Universidad Nacional Abierta (UNA)
 Instituto Universitario de Tecnología Agro Industrial (IUTAI)
 Instituto Universitario Politecnico Santiago Mariño
 Instituto Universitario Antonio Jose de Sucre
 Instituto Universitario Monseñor Talavera
 Instituto Universitario Jesus Enrique Lozada
 Instituto Universitario de Tecnología Juan Pablo Pérez Alfonzo (IUTEPAL)

Law and government
San Cristóbal has one municipality: San Cristóbal Municipality, Venezuelan law specifies that municipal governments have four main functions:  executive, legislative, comptroller, and planning. The executive function is managed by the mayor, who is in charge of representing the municipality's administration. The legislative branch is represented by the Municipal Council, composed of  seven councillors, charged with the deliberation of new decrees and local laws. The comptroller tasks are managed by the municipal comptroller's office, which oversees accountancy. Finally, planning is represented by the Local Public Planning Council, which manages development projects for the municipality.

Economy

San Cristobal is the capital of the Tachira State. As throughout the Andean states, the people of Táchira are characterized as hardworking, cordial, conservative, and devoted to their historical, religious, and folkloric traditions. The primary industries here are centered around agriculture, mainly the production of coffee, sugar, and vegetables. Other important industrial sectors which have helped fuel the economic engines of the region include meat production (cattle), manufacturing industries like shoe, basket, and ceramics production. A fact that perhaps is not widely known is that it was in Táchira State, and not in Zulia State, that the first oil wells were excavated in 1875(located in the Petrolea sector close to Rubio)-- a procedure done in those days by hand and with buckets. It is a commercial, transportation, and industrial center. Textiles, leather products, cement, and tobacco are produced, and coffee, sugar, pineapples, and corn are exported. The service sector is also strong. There are many branches of national banks located in the city, and it is the headquarters of an important financial institutions Sofitasa (bank of private investment). This bank is an important economic engine of the local economy because they help to finance many project in the region. In the dairy industry, Leche Táchira is one of the most consolidated industries in the country; this company is based in San Cristobal.

Sports
Deportivo Táchira Fútbol Club, usually known as Deportivo Táchira, is a football club located in San Cristóbal.

Architecture 
San Cristóbal's architecture is rich and varied. The wedding cake and modernist architectural styles are particularly evident in the façades of the Universidad Nacional Abierta and La Casa Antigua, a Spanish style building with various ornaments and sculptures. Another example is La Entrada Central, the only façade that's left from the old Hospital Vargas. Among the most notable churches are La Iglesia El Angel, the Gothic styled church San José, and the El Santuario Church.

Transportation
There are three airports that serve Táchira State and its capital San Cristobal. Juan Vicente Gómez International Airport of San Antonio, Mayor Buenaventura Vivas Airport of Santo Domingo del Táchira and La Fría Airport of La Fria. There is a bus terminal located just below the La Concordia neighborhood of San Cristóbal where buses, taxis, and other vehicles arrive and depart daily.

Notable people

Rafael de Nogales Méndez, soldier and writer
Isaías Medina Angarita, military leader and former president of Venezuela
Manuel Felipe Rugeles, poet and journalist
Joel Casique, artist who formed the Escuela Cristóbal Rojas de Caracas
Luis Felipe Ramón y Rivera, folklorist and musician
Francisco Arias Cárdenas, former governor of Zulia State, presidential candidate, and Venezuelan ambassador to the UN
Martín Marciales Moncada, entrepreneur and philanthropist
Giancarlo Maldonado, footballer
Marco Antonio Rivera Useche, musician and composer
Tomás Rincón, footballer
Júnior Moreno, footballer
Édgar Ramírez, actor
Mikel Villanueva, footballer.

Attractions and surroundings
One of the most celebrated festivities which attracts visitors from all over is the Feria Internacional de San Sebastián held annually at Pueblo Nuevo next to Táchira state football club's grounds. This fair, which occurs at the end of January, combines bullfighting festivities with a myriad of sport activities such as the Vuelta al Táchira, a bicycle race, artistic festivals, agricultural fairs, and many other spectacles. Nearby small businesses, in particular eateries, restaurants and small independent retailers thrive of the activities in Pueblo nuevo.

Places to visit in and around San Cristóbal include all the squares and parks around the city, the enchanting colonial town of San Pedro del Río and Peribeca. During Christmas these towns are full of decorations and mangers of every shape and size. Near the border with Colombia is the town of San Antonio de Táchira, with its lively commercial beat. Other interesting towns are Palmira and Abejales, above the town of Tariba, famous for their sugar cane baskets, and the town of El Topón, a typical agricultural town. The water fall of Chorro el Indio is an entertaining place to visit and be surrounded by nature.

Plaza de los Mangos, in Barrio Obrero, is a popular youth hangout close to San Cristobal's city centre. A leafy square home to music shops, imported clothing retailers, Mini malls, nightclubs, eateries, ice-cream parlours, pool halls, Internet cafés, and small music venues, Plaza de los Mangos has become a busy hub for youth life. On a small offshoot road on the Plaza's north-eastern corner, a small Virgin Mary figure is housed under a protruding old tree branch, a branch once used for public hangings; the date of the last hanging varies with who you ask.

Events
Feria Internacional de San Sebastian. the San Sebastian fair is the largest fair in the country. It takes place at the end of each January. There is animal, agricultural, industrial and commercial trade.

Gallery Images

International relations

Twin towns and sister cities
San Cristóbal is twinned with the following cities and municipalities:

References

 
Cities in Táchira
1561 establishments in the Spanish Empire
Populated places established in 1561